Sri T V S Rao Srikrishna Vidya Mandir is a co-educational school in Visakhapatnam. It was established in the year 1975 and is affiliated to Central Board of Secondary Education.

Campus 
The school has a separate block for Kindergarten and Primary sections in Lalitha Nagar, Visakhapatnam. This block is also called Sri Kapila Gopal Rao Srikrishna Vidya Sisu Mandir.

The blocks for upper primary and secondary sections are in Dwaraka Nagar, Visakhapatnam. The class rooms are in 2 building blocks christened as Dwaraka and Mathura respectively.

Academics 
The school is permanently affiliated to Central Board of Secondary Education.

English is taught as the first language. As second language, students are offered a choice between Telugu or Hindi until class 9. In addition, a third language of Sanskrit is introduced from class 6 and taught until class 9. For the class 10, English and predominately Sanskrit are currently taught as first and second languages respectively.

Prayer 
Morning prayer consists of meditation, as well as chats of Aditya-Hrudayam and Gayatri-Matra. 
On Fridays, Mantra-Pushpam and Lingastakam are recited additionally.

Extra curricular activities 
There are weekly periods for physical training, sports, dance and music. School students are also involved in community services.

Sports 
Students are trained in sports of Volleyball, Handball, Kho-Kho, Kabaddi, Judo and track-and-field events like Running (Sprints), Jumps (high- and long) and Throws (javelin-, discus- and shot put).

From 2010 on wards school focused in developing students in ARCHERY and now Students are successful in winning laurels at State and National Level.

Music and Dance 
School has its own music band and offers regular training lessons in instrumental music. There are also regular and crash course lessons in classical dance for students pursuing at professional levels or just annual day events respectively.

House System 
In addition, there is a house system to promote leadership and group activities among students. Each house is further mentored by 2 teachers with Student from 10th Std. as Captain and take responsibility to lead the House team in both Physical & Cultural activities.

There are four houses namely Sri Krishna Deya Raya, Shivaji, Raman and Vivekananda.

Events

Sports and cultural fests 
Every year a fest is organised by the school where students and their respective houses compete in different sports, cultural and literature events.

Besides these intra-school events, students actively participate and have also won several awards at other inter-school, city, district and state level competitions annually.

Students of the school participate in Khelkhud (Sports Meet) organised at District Level by its parent organisation BVK and winners will participate in State Level and National Level Khelkhud Organised by VIDYA BHARATI., Students who succeed in National Meet will participate in SGFI Sports meet and compete with other state level players.
Students also actively participate in District, State and National Level Literature symposium - Vigyan Mela where students participate in Paper Presentation, Samskruti Gyan Pariksha, Science Quiz and Science Exhibition.

Annual Day 
Students and their houses who have excelled in academics, extra-curricular during the fests and all-round performances are awarded on the annual day.

Krishna Astami 
On the eve of Krishna Janmashtami (or Lord Krishna' Birthday), a fancy dress competition called Bala-Gokulam is organised for kids in the morning. Whereas the school students showcase their house decorations along with short drama skits.

Indian Republic and Independence Days 
Indian republic and independence days are celebrated with great vigor with flag hoisting and patriotic songs.

See also 
 List of schools in India
 Visakhapatnam

References 

Schools in Visakhapatnam district
Educational institutions established in 1975
1975 establishments in Andhra Pradesh